

Track listing

Performance 1
Recorded at "Huset" Copenhagen Denmark - 25 May 1978

Personnel
Ingemar Bergman: Drums
Mats Lindberg: Bass, 12-String Guitar & Moog Taurus Pedals
Hans Lundin: Fender Rhodes, Minimoog, Crumar Organ, Korg String 2000, Vocal
Mats Löfgren: Vocal, Electric Guitar, Percussion, Glockenspiel
Roine Stolt: Electric Guitar

Track listing
"Total Förvirring" (Roine Stolt, Mats Löfgren) – 8:42
"Skenet Bedrar" (Hans Lundin) – 16:29
"Visan i Sommaren" (Hans Lundin) – 3:23
"En Igelkotts Död/Ömsom Sken" (Hans Lundin/Roine Stolt, Ingemar Bergman) – 4:33
"Inget Nytt Under Solen" (Roine Stolt) – 8:02
"Copenhagen House Jam" (Ingemar Bergman, Mats Lindberg, Hans Lundin, Mats Löfgren, Roine Stolt) – 5:48
"Flytet" (Roine Stolt) – 2:54

Performances 2-4

Personnel
Ingemar Bergman: Drums & Vocal
Tomas Eriksson: Bass & Vocal
Hans Lundin: Hammond Organ, Fender Rhodes, Yamaha SY Synthesizer, Logan String-Machine & Vocal
Roine Stolt: Electric Guitar & Talk-Box

Tracks Performance 2
Recorded at "Östanåskolan" Eksjö Sweden - 2 March 1976 
8. "Musiken Är Ljuset" (Hans Lundin) - 7:30 
9. "Se Var Morgon Gry" (Hans Lundin) - 9:13

Tracks Performance 3
Recorded at "Bullerbyn" Stockholm Sweden - 7 April 1977 
10. "Noice-Village-Stone-Frog" (Ingemar Bergman, Tomas Eriksson, Hans Lundin, Roine Stolt) - 5:49

Tracks Performance 4
Recorded at "Stenungsundsgymnasiet" Stenungsund Sweden - 27 April 1977 
11. "Oceaner Föder Liv (End Part)" (Roine Stolt) - 7:05

Kaipa albums
2005 live albums